The 2009–10 Saudi Professional League (known as the Zain Professional League for sponsorship reasons) was the 34th season of the Saudi Professional League, the top Saudi professional league for association football clubs, since its establishment in 1976. The season began on 18 August 2009, and ended on 18 March 2010. Al-Ittihad were the defending champions.

Al-Hilal secured the title with a 2–0 win away to Al-Hazem on 24 January 2010. Al-Hilal won the league with three games to spare. Al-Hilal, Al-Ittihad, Al-Shabab and Al-Nassr all secured a berth for the 2011 AFC Champions League. No teams were relegated at the end of the season following the decision to increase the number of teams from 12 to 14.

Name sponsorship
On 16 June 2009, the Saudi Professional League announced a sponsorship with telecommunication company Zain. As part of the sponsorship deal the Saudi Professional League would be known as the Zain Professional League for the next 4 seasons.

Qualification and Prize Money 
The League champions, runners-up and third-placed team, as well as the winners of the King Cup of Champions, qualify for the 2011 AFC Champions League.

The top six teams, and the Crown Prince Cup winners and runners-up qualify for King Cup of Champions.

 Prize money:
 First place: 2.5 million Saudi Riyals
 Second place: 1.5 million Saudi Riyals
 Third place: 1 million Saudi Riyals

Teams
Twelve teams competed in the league – the top nine teams from the previous season, the relegation play-off winner and the two teams promoted from the First Division. Al-Raed defeated Abha 4–3 on aggregate to confirm their top-flight status. The promoted teams were Al-Qadisiyah (returning after a season's absence) and Al-Fateh (playing top-flight football for the first time ever). They replaced Abha (relegated after a season's presence) and Al-Watani (ending their two-year top-flight spell).

Stadiums and locations

Personnel

Managerial changes

Foreign players
The number of foreign players is restricted to four per team, including a slot for a player from AFC countries.

Players name in bold indicates the player is registered during the mid-season transfer window.

League table

Results

Season statistics

Scoring

Top scorers

Hat-tricks 

Notes
4 Player scored 4 goals(H) – Home team(A) – Away team

Most assists

Clean sheets

Discipline

Player 
 Most yellow cards: 8
 Ramzi Ben Younès (Al-Fateh)

 Most red cards: 2
 Abdullah Al-Garni (Al-Nassr)
 Zakaria Al-Hadaf (Al-Qadsiah)
 Mansoor Al-Harbi (Al-Ahli)
 Ahmed Menawer (Al-Hazem)

Club 
 Most yellow cards: 56
 Al-Hazem

 Most red cards: 8
 Al-Ittihad

Awards

Arriyadiyah and Mobily Awards for Sports Excellence
The Arriyadiyah and Mobily Awards for Sports Excellence were awarded at the conclusion of the season for the fourth time since its inception in 2007. The awards were sponsored by Saudi newspaper Arriyadiyah and Saudi telecommunication company Mobily. The awards were presented on 13 May 2010.

Al-Riyadiya Awards
Another set of awards were awarded at the end of the season. It was announced that Al-Riyadiya were presenting their awards for the first time. The awards were known as Al-Riyadiya Awards and were presented on 8 May 2010.

Best Goalkeeper:  Waleed Abdullah (Al-Shabab)
Best Defender:  Osama Hawsawi (Al-Hilal)
Best Midfielder:  Christian Wilhelmsson (Al-Hilal)
Best Attacker:  Mohammad Al-Sahlawi (Al-Nassr)
Player of the Year:  Osama Hawsawi (Al-Hilal)

See also 
 2010 King Cup of Champions
 2009–10 Crown Prince Cup (Final)
 2011 AFC Champions League

References

External links 
 Saudi Arabia Football Federation
 Saudi League Statistics

2009-10
2009–10 in Asian association football leagues
Professional League